The Queensland Crime Commission (QCC) was an independent Queensland Government entity established on 2 March 1998 to investigate criminal activity, in particular,
criminal paedophilia and major and organised crime. On 1 January 2002, the QCC and the former Criminal Justice Commission were merged to establish the Queensland Crime and Misconduct Commission.

References

Further reading

 Tim Carmody SC (2001) "The role of the Queensland Crime Commission in the investigation of organised and major criminal activity" 4th National Outlook Symposium on Crime in Australia: New Crimes or New Responses 21–22 June 2001 Rydges Lakeside, Canberra

Crime
Crime in Queensland
2002 disestablishments in Australia
1998 establishments in Australia
Government agencies established in 1998
Government agencies disestablished in 2002